is an underground metro station located in Atsuta-ku, Nagoya, Aichi Prefecture, Japan operated by the Nagoya Municipal Subway's Meijō Line. It is located 25.3 kilometers from the terminus of the Meijō Line at Kanayama Station. This station provides access to Shirotori Park, Atsuta Shrine Park, and Takakura Park.

History
Nishi Takakura Station was opened on 30 March 1974.

Lines

 (Station number: M28)

Layout
Nishi Takakura Station has two underground opposed side platforms.

Platforms

References

External links
 Nishi Takakura Station official web site 

Atsuta-ku, Nagoya
Railway stations in Japan opened in 1974
Railway stations in Nagoya